Retropharyngeal may refer to:
 Retropharyngeal abscess
 Retropharyngeal space